Gürlevik is a village in the Erzincan District, Erzincan Province, Turkey. The village is populated by Kurds of the Abasan tribe and had a population of 16 in 2021. The hamlets of Akpınar, Çevreli and Yaylacık are attached to the village.

References 

Villages in Erzincan District
Kurdish settlements in Erzincan Province